Junior Kabananga Kalonji (born 4 April 1989) is a Congolese professional footballer who plays as a striker for Maktaaral and the DR Congo national team.

Club career
Born in Kinshasa, Kabananga began his early career with FC MK Etanchéité.

Anderlecht
He made his senior debut for Belgian club Anderlecht in the 2010–11 season, although Anderlecht later admitted negligence when transferring the player from Democratic Republic of the Congo after a forged document was used.

Loans to Beerschot and Roeselare
He moved on loan to Germinal Beerschot in January 2011, and also spent the 2012–13 season on loan at Roeselare.

Cercle Brugge
He signed a permanent two-year contract with Cercle Brugge in July 2013.

Astana
In June 2015 he signed a two-and-a-half-year contract with Kazakhstan Premier League side FC Astana. In June 2016 he returned from the loan. On 27 July 2017, Kabananga signed a new two-year contract with Astana.

Karabükspor(loan)
On 1 February 2016, Kabananga joined Kardemir Karabükspor on loan until the end of the 2015–16 Turkish season.

Al-Nassr and Astana(loan) return
On 31 January 2018, Kabananga signed a $2 million two-and-a-half-year contract with Al-Nassr. He returned on loan to Astana in September 2018.

Suzhou Dongwu
On 10 June 2021, Kabananga joined China League One side Suzhou Dongwu.

Mioveni
In August 2022, Kabananga joined Liga I club Mioveni. He left the club in January 2023.

Maktaaral
In February 2023, Kabananga signed a contract with Kazakh club Maktaaral.

International career
Kabananga made his international debut for DR Congo in 2014. In January 2015 he was named in the final squad for the 2015 Africa Cup of Nations.

Career statistics

Club

International

Scores and results list DR Congo's goal tally first.

Honours
Astana
Kazakhstan Premier League: 2015, 2016, 2017, 2018
Kazakhstan Cup: 2016
Kazakhstan Super Cup: 2019

DR Congo
Africa Cup of Nations bronze: 2015

Individual
Africa Cup of Nations top scorer: 2017
Africa Cup of Nations Team of the tournament: 2017

References

1989 births
Living people
Democratic Republic of the Congo footballers
FC MK Etanchéité players
R.S.C. Anderlecht players
Beerschot A.C. players
K.S.V. Roeselare players
Cercle Brugge K.S.V. players
FC Astana players
Al Nassr FC players
Qatar SC players
FC Shakhtyor Soligorsk players
Kardemir Karabükspor footballers
Suzhou Dongwu F.C. players
CS Mioveni players
Belgian Pro League players
Challenger Pro League players
TFF First League players
Kazakhstan Premier League players
Saudi Professional League players
Qatar Stars League players
Liga I players
Association football forwards
Democratic Republic of the Congo international footballers
2015 Africa Cup of Nations players
2017 Africa Cup of Nations players
Democratic Republic of the Congo expatriate footballers
Democratic Republic of the Congo expatriate sportspeople in Belgium
Expatriate footballers in Belgium
Democratic Republic of the Congo expatriate sportspeople in Kazakhstan
Expatriate footballers in Kazakhstan
Democratic Republic of the Congo expatriate sportspeople in Turkey
Expatriate footballers in Turkey
Democratic Republic of the Congo expatriate sportspeople in Saudi Arabia
Expatriate footballers in Saudi Arabia
Expatriate footballers in Qatar
Democratic Republic of the Congo expatriate sportspeople in Qatar
Expatriate footballers in Belarus
Democratic Republic of the Congo expatriate sportspeople in China
Expatriate footballers in China
Democratic Republic of the Congo expatriate sportspeople in Romania
Expatriate footballers in Romania
Footballers from Kinshasa
21st-century Democratic Republic of the Congo people
FC Maktaaral players